Leanchoilia is an megacheiran arthropod known from Cambrian deposits of the Burgess Shale in Canada and the Chengjiang biota of China. Its internal organs are occasionally preserved within the substrate in three dimensions.

Seven species are tentatively accepted today: L. superlata (the type species), L. persephone and L. protogonia from the Burgess Shale, L. illecebrosa and L. obesa from the Chengjiang biota, ''L. robisoni from Kaili, and L.? hanceyi from the Spence Shale. L. superlata and L. persephone may however be examples of sexual dimorphism. 55 specimens of Leanchoilia are known from the Greater Phyllopod bed, where they comprise 0.1% of the community.

References

External links 
 

Leanchoilia illecebrosa Ancient Arthropod from Chengjiang The Virtual Fossil Museum

Megacheira
Burgess Shale fossils
Maotianshan shales fossils
Prehistoric arthropod genera
Taxa named by Charles Doolittle Walcott
Fossil taxa described in 1912
Cambrian genus extinctions
Wheeler Shale
Cambrian arthropods